Bertie Raymond Ross (1909 - 17 November 1987) was a New Zealand first-class cricketer who played two matches for Wellington.

Ross was born in Lower Hutt.

External links 
  from Cricinfo.

1909 births
1987 deaths
New Zealand cricketers
Wellington cricketers